The Battle of Memel or Battle of Klaipėda might refer to:

Battle of Memel (1257) between the Samogitians and the Livonian Order
Battle of Memel (1323) between the Samogitians and the Livonian Order
Battle of Gross-Jägersdorf (1757), between Prussia and the Russian Empire
Battle of Memel (1944) between Soviet Union and Nazi Germany

See also
 Battle of Niemen